Šatorovići is a village in the municipality of Brčko, Bosnia and Herzegovina. The number of residents is about 2,000.

Demographics 
According to the 2013 census, its population was 1,472.

References

Villages in Brčko District